Glass City Con X Midwest Media Expo was a two-day multi-genre convention held during July at the SeaGate Convention Centre in Toledo, Ohio. The convention was created by the merger of Glass City Con and Midwest Media Expo. This event only lasted a year before becoming inactive with an uncertain future.

Event history

Glass City Con X Midwest Media Expo

Glass City Con
Glass City Con (formerly GarasuNoShiCon) was an annual two-day anime convention held during July at the SeaGate Convention Centre in Toledo, Ohio. In Japanese, "GarasuNoShiCon" means "Glass City Convention". The convention typically offered anime screenings, an artist alley, a cosplay competition, card and tabletop games, video games, LARP (live action role playing), a rave, vendors, and workshops. In 2010, it held a charity auction that benefited the American Red Cross, and in 2011, it supported Child's Play.

Glass City Con was founded in 2009 by Aaron Auzins and Chris Zasada and was organized by members of the Gamers United, Japanese Club, and Owens' Anime Convention clubs. The convention was originally free to attend in 2010 and 2011 and was held at Owens Community College. It expanded in 2014 and moved to the Seagate Convention Centre. The convention eventually was merged with Midwest Media Expo to create Glass City Con X Midwest Media Expo. This merged event lasted one year before becoming inactive.

Midwest Media Expo
Midwest Media Expo (M2X) was an annual three day multi-genre convention held during April at the Edward Village Michigan in Dearborn, Michigan. The convention was organized by the group behind Youmacon. Midwest Media Expo typically offered an artist alley, exhibitor hall,  formal ball, gaming (board, card, tabletop, video), musical events, and a rave. Video gaming ran 24-hours during the convention.

Midwest Media Expo in 2017 was to be held at the Edward Hotel & Convention Center, but was cancelled due to a problem with the hotel a few days before it was scheduled to start.

Not Con
Not Con was a three-day convention held during April at the Radisson Hotel Detroit - Farmington Hills in Farmington Hills, Michigan. It was a free replacement for the cancelled 2017 Midwest Media Expo.

Other Related News Articles
The Midwest Media Expo Is Cancelled Three Days Before The Doors Were Set To Open Bleeding Cool, Retrieved 2018-09-20
Detroit-Based Comic Con Suddenly Cancelled Three Days Before Event (Updated) io9, Retrieved 2018-09-20

Notes

References

Defunct anime conventions
Defunct multigenre conventions
Film festivals established in 2014
Recurring events established in 2009
2014 establishments in Michigan
2009 establishments in Ohio
2018 establishments in Ohio
Annual events in Michigan
Annual events in Ohio
Film festivals in Michigan
Festivals in Ohio
Culture of Toledo, Ohio
Tourist attractions in Wayne County, Michigan
Tourist attractions in Toledo, Ohio
Conventions in Michigan
Conventions in Ohio